Colli a Volturno is a comune (municipality) in the Province of Isernia in the Italian region Molise, located about  west of Campobasso and about  west of Isernia.   

Colli a Volturno borders the following municipalities: Cerro al Volturno, Filignano, Fornelli, Macchia d'Isernia, Montaquila, Monteroduni, Rocchetta a Volturno, Scapoli.

References

External links
Pro Loco Colli(Italian)
www.colliavolturno.com

Cities and towns in Molise